Pseudorthodes vecors, the small brown Quaker, is a species of cutworm or dart moth in the family Noctuidae. It is found in North America.

The MONA or Hodges number for Pseudorthodes vecors is 10578.

References

Further reading

 
 
 

Eriopygini
Articles created by Qbugbot
Moths described in 1852